Cloghan is a village in the rural centre of County Donegal, Ireland.

Cloghan has one of the most prolific wild salmon and sea trout fishing areas in Ireland.

The area is also known as a hunting location and has miles of hiking trails in the Bluestack Mountains that divides County Donegal, north from south.

Irish language
There are 488 people living in the area, and 38% are Irish speakers.

People
 James Hannigan, former Bishop of Menevia and Bishop of Wrexham, was born in Cloghan.
 Frank McGlynn, Gaelic footballer, was born in Cloghan.
 Patrick John Carlin, father of Irish-American comedian George Carlin.

See also
 List of populated places in Ireland

References

Towns and villages in County Donegal